The following lists events that happened during 2006 in Burundi.

Events

December
 December 22 - United Nations Secretary General Kofi Annan warns of "troubling developments" in Burundi that could lead to violence.

References

 
Years of the 21st century in Burundi
2000s in Burundi
Burundi
Burundi